Arjun Firoz Khan is an Indian actor, best known for playing the character of warrior prince Arjuna in B. R. Chopra's epic television series Mahabharat. He has also acted in negative roles in several Hindi language movies and television series.

Personal life 
Firoz Khan is married to Kashmira. The couple has three children – a son and two daughters. His son, Jibran Khan is also an actor who played the role of Dhruva in Vishnu Puran and played the role of Krishna in Kabhie Khushi Kabhie Gham.

Due to the similarity with the name of actor Feroz Khan, he changed his name to Arjun professionally, with suggestions from B. R. Chopra and Rahi Masoom Raza, the director and the writer of Mahabharat respectively.

Filmography

Television

References

External links 
 

Indian male film actors
Indian male television actors
20th-century Indian male actors
21st-century Indian male actors
Living people
1962 births